The 1948 NCAA baseball season, play of college baseball in the United States organized by the National Collegiate Athletic Association (NCAA) began in the spring of 1948. The season progressed through the regular season and concluded with the 1948 NCAA baseball tournament and 1948 College World Series. The College World Series, held for the second time in 1948, consisted of the two remaining teams in the NCAA Tournament and was held in Kalamazoo, Michigan at Hyames Field as a best of three series. Southern California claimed the championship two games to one over Yale.

Conference winners 
This is a partial list of conference champions from the 1948 season. Each of the eight geographical districts chose, by various methods, the team that would represent them in the NCAA Tournament. Conference champions had to be chosen, unless all conference champions declined the bid.

Conference standings 
The following is an incomplete list of conference standings:

NCAA tournament 

The 1948 season marked the second NCAA Baseball Tournament, which consisted of eight teams divided into two brackets by region. The Eastern playoff was held in Winston-Salem, North Carolina, while the Western playoff was held in Denver, Colorado. Unlike the previous year, a double-elimination format was used. The winner of each bracket advanced to the College World Series in Kalamazoo, MI, where Southern California defeated Yale in a best of three series.

Award winners

All-America team

References